Melrose is a city located in the Greater Boston metropolitan area in Middlesex County, Massachusetts, United States. Its population, per the 2020 United States Census, is 29,817. It is a suburb located approximately seven miles north of Boston. It is situated in the center of the triangle created by Interstates 93, 95 and U.S. Route 1.

The land that comprises Melrose was first settled in 1628 and was once part of Charlestown and then Malden. It became the Town of Melrose in 1850 and then the City of Melrose in 1900.

History

Melrose was originally called "Ponde Fielde" for its abundance of ponds and streams or "Mystic Side" because of its location in a valley north of the Mystic River. The area was first explored by Richard and Ralph Sprague in 1628 and became part of Charlestown in 1633 along with a large area of land encompassing most of the surrounding communities. 

In 1649, the neighborhood of Charlestown known as Malden was incorporated as a separate town; the new town of Malden included most of present-day Melrose (then called North Malden) within its borders. North Malden largely remained a lightly populated farming community. By 1845, the Boston and Maine Railroad had built three stops (now the commuter rail stations of Wyoming Hill, Melrose/Cedar Park, and Melrose Highlands). Boston workers in search of a country atmosphere moved to the area and began commuting to work. The population of North Malden began growing, and in 1850 North Malden split from Malden proper and was incorporated as the town of Melrose. The town then annexed the highlands from neighboring Stoneham in 1853, creating the city's current borders. The name "Melrose" comes from the burgh of Melrose, Scotland. It was a reference to the Eildon hills of Melrose, Scotland, which the new town resembled. The name was suggested and advocated for by William Bogle, a Scotland native and longtime resident of North Malden.

The population of Melrose continued to grow throughout the second half of the nineteenth century. Farmland was increasingly partitioned into smaller parcels for residences and businesses. The fire department and the town's school district were founded, and the town hall was built in 1873. In 1899, the City of Melrose became the 33rd incorporated city in Massachusetts. Levi S. Gould became the city's first mayor on January 1, 1900. Melrose reached a peak in a population of 33,180 residents in 1970, before beginning a slow decline continuing through 2010. On April 1, 1982, Downtown Melrose was added to the National Register of Historic Places; the public library was similarly added to the register in 1988.

Geography
Melrose is located at  (42.459045, −71.062339).

The city's largest body of water is Ell Pond, situated near the center of the city, while other major bodies are Swains Pond and Towners Pond, located on the east side near Mount Hood Golf Club.

It borders four cities and towns: Malden, Saugus, Stoneham, and Wakefield. Major geographic features include Ell Pond, Swains Pond, Sewall Woods, Mount Hood, Boston Rock, Pine Banks Park, and the eastern reaches of the Middlesex Fells Reservation.

The writer Elizabeth George Speare, who was born in Melrose, wrote of her hometown: "Melrose was an ideal place in which to have grown up, close to fields and woods where we hiked and picnicked, and near to Boston where we frequently had family treats of theaters and concerts."

Neighborhoods 
 Cedar Park
 Downtown Melrose
 East Side
 Horace Mann
 Melrose Highlands
 Mount Hood
 Oak Grove/Pine Banks
 Wyoming

Government
Paul Brodeur is the Mayor of Melrose as of November 2019, taking over for Gail Infurna who had served since early 2018, replacing Mayor Robert J. Dolan, who resigned to take a position as Town Administrator in nearby Lynnfield. Melrose is represented by Jason Lewis (D) in the Massachusetts Senate. Melrose is part of the fifth Congressional district of Massachusetts, and is represented by Katherine Clark (D). The current U.S. senators from Massachusetts are Edward J. Markey (D) and Elizabeth Warren (D).

Melrose is served by an eleven-member City council. The entire city elects four At-Large City Councilors and seven Ward Councilors, elected by voters in their wards. Beginning in the 2007 election, the mayor's position became a four-year term (from two) and was given a seat on the School Committee. All councilors are elected to two-year terms. City elections are held in odd-numbered years.

Demographics

As of the census of 2010, there were 26,983 people, 11,213 households, and 7,076 families residing in the city.  The racial makeup of the city was 91.1% White, 2.4% African American, 0.1% Native American, 3.8% Asian, 0.9% from other races, and 1.7% from two or more races. Hispanic or Latino of any race were 2.5% of the population.

There were 11,213 households, out of which 28.4% had children under the age of 18 living with them, 51.4% were married couples living together, 9.1% had a female householder with no husband present, and 36.9% were non-families. Of all households, 31.3% were individuals living alone, and 13.5% were composed of an individual 65 years or older living alone. The average household size was 2.38, and the average family size was 3.05.

In the city, the population was spread out, with 23.5% under the age of 20, 4.0% from 20 to 24, 27.4% from 25 to 44, 29.2% from 45 to 64, and 15.9% who were 65 years of age or older. The median age was 41.9 years. For every 100 females, there were 88.8 males. For every 100 females age 18 and over, there were 85.4 males.

Education

The Melrose School district runs several schools including The Franklin Early Childhood Center, five elementary schools (Roosevelt, Lincoln, Winthrop, Hoover, and Horace Mann), Melrose Veterans Memorial Middle School (MVMMS), and Melrose High School.  The city also has a private elementary school, St. Mary of the Annunciation, run by one of the city's Catholic churches of the same name. The Franklin Early Childhood Center houses preschool, Pre-K, and multiage programs. MVMMS is a school to about one thousand eleven- through fourteen-year-olds and was the winner of the 2002 Massachusetts Department of Education's Compass School Award, the 2007 Massachusetts Technology Collaborative's Green School Award (for its use of solar energy), and the 2008 New England League of Middle Schools' Spotlight School Award.

Health care
There are many health care facilities located in Melrose. MelroseWakefield Hospital, a 234-bed non-profit hospital, was home to the world's first cochlear implant and laser surgery and it was among the first hospitals in the country to offer same day surgery.  In addition to the hospital, there are many pediatricians, specialists, dentists and dermatologists. Also, the city's Milano Senior Center provides social, recreational, health, and educational programs for Melrose's senior citizens.

Transportation
Although the only highway in Melrose is a short section of Route 99, the city has access to many nearby highways including Route 1 in Saugus, Interstate 93 in Stoneham, Massachusetts Route 16 in Everett, and Route 128/Interstate 95 in Wakefield. The city is also served by the MBTA. Service includes three bus routes: 131, 132 and 137. There are three commuter rail stations: Wyoming Hill, Melrose/Cedar Park, and Melrose Highlands. Oak Grove, which is the northern terminus of the  Orange Line subway system, is located in Malden on the Melrose city line. Oak Grove is primarily a park-and-ride station.

Media

Melrose has a weekly newspaper, the Melrose Weekly News, while there was formerly a second print newspaper, the Melrose Free Press, which after a brief stint as the online-only Melrose Free Press Observer, merged with the Saugus Advertizer to become The Free Press & Advertizer in 2022. There is also a daily online news site, Melrose Patch. Melrose Massachusetts Television (MMTV) is a Public-access television cable TV station available to all customers and broadcasts Government-access television (GATV) community notices as well as resident produced Public-access television cable TV content.

In the fall of 2009, the Ben Affleck movie The Town captured many key scenes in a historic bank on Main Street downtown, while around the same time, Cameron Diaz and Tom Cruise's movie Knight & Day shot scenes on the Fellsway. The same month, a documentary for PBS about the Scopes Trial was also shot in the Aldermanic Chamber of Melrose City Hall. In 2022, the AppleTV+ movie Spirited, featuring Ryan Reynolds and Will Ferrell, had scenes filmed in Melrose.

On September 22, 2016, Melrose was again named one of the "hottest zip codes" in the nation by Realtor.com. It had been number one in the nation in 2015 before falling to number seven in 2016. Also, as of January 2019, CartoChrome rated Melrose to have one of the top 13 percent of ZIP Codes (02176) in the United States for a resident living in the area to access health care, because of its hospital system, physician density, and ease of patients accessing a doctor from travel distance. The average distance a patient travels to a doctor is four miles.

See also 

 Melrose Symphony Orchestra
 National Register of Historic Places listings in Middlesex County, Massachusetts
 Pine Banks
 Middlesex Fells Reservation
 Mount Hood Golf Club

References

External links

 City of Melrose official website
 City-Data.com Melrose Profile
 Melrose Business Directory

 
Cities in Massachusetts
Populated places established in 1629
1629 establishments in Massachusetts
Cities in Middlesex County, Massachusetts